The 1994 Oklahoma gubernatorial election was held on November 8, 1994, and was a race for Governor of Oklahoma. Former United States Associate Attorney General Frank Keating pulled an upset in the three-way race to become only the third Republican governor in Oklahoma history.

The Democratic vote was split between Lieutenant Governor Jack Mildren and former Democratic congressman Wes Watkins, who ran as an independent. Watkins won 24% of the vote and carried numerous counties (by wide margins in some cases); his 233,000 votes far exceeded Keating's 171,000-vote winning margin over Mildren.

This was the first time since Oklahoma statehood that Jackson County, Stephens County, and Grady County voted Republican in a gubernatorial election, and the first time since 1914 that Comanche County voted Republican.

Candidates

Democrat
Jack Mildren, Lieutenant Governor of Oklahoma
Danny Williams
Bernice Shedrick, state senator
Joe Vickers

Republican
Frank Keating- Assistant Attorney General, General Counsel member, and Deputy Secretary of Housing and Urban Development under President George H. W. Bush; Assistant Secretary of the Treasury and United States Associate Attorney General under President Ronald Reagan
Jerry Pierce
Virginia Hale
Thomas H. Lay
Jerry Kobyluk

Independent
Wes Watkins- former U.S. Congressman

Democratic primary
Lt. Governor Jack Mildren and Bernice Shedrick advanced to the runoff where both candidates received vote totals similar to the first primary, securing the win for Mildren.

Results

Republican primary
Frank Keating, a former assistant attorney general and member of the Reagan and Bush administrations, defeated four other Republicans to win the GOP nomination.

Results

General election

Polling

Results

References

1994
Gubernatorial
Okla